Pedro Duarte may refer to
Pedro Duarte (general) (1829–1902), Paraguayan general
Pedro Duarte (footballer, born 1972), Portuguese goalkeeper 
Pedro Duarte (footballer, born 1978), Portuguese left-back footballer